Mudassar Nazar (Urdu: مدثر نذر; born 6 April 1956) is a Pakistani cricket coach and former cricketer with a career in Test cricket for Pakistan and in league cricket in Pakistan and England. He was an opening batsman who played 76 test and 122 one-day matches for Pakistan. After retiring from professional cricket, he has had a number of administrative positions in the cricketing world, including two stints as coach for Pakistan in 1993 and 2001, for Kenya and for several other teams. He was born in Lahore, Punjab.

Currently, he is appointed an Advisor for Lahore Qalandars franchise cricket team in Pakistan Super League.

International career

Mudassar made his debut in Test cricket for Pakistan against Australia in Adelaide on 24 December 1976. The son of Test cricketer Nazar Mohammad, he followed in his father's footsteps to open Pakistan's opening batting. Mudassar now resides in Bolton, England. He played for many prominent league teams in Pakistan, and played his last Test match against New Zealand at Auckland on 28 February 1989, but he continued playing first-class cricket until 1993. He became the second Pakistani after his father to carry the bat as an opener in the fifth Test of the 1982–83 series against India.

One time, Mudassar held a record for highest partnership in Test Cricket of 451-runs, 3rd-wicket with Javed Miandad against India at Hyderabad, Pakistan in 1982–83. He also holds the record for the slowest Test match century and also in terms of minutes (557). He was also a useful bowling option for his captain and earned the reputation of a shock bowler because he was good at breaking long partnerships and batsmen who played long innings.

In the mid-1980s, Mudassar became a spokesman for the Pakistan players' association and claims that criticisms he made about the Pakistan Cricket Board (PCB) led to him being omitted from the Pakistan side.

Coaching career
After retiring from professional cricket, Mudassar became national coach for Pakistan and has coached a number of other teams, including Kenya's national team in the season of 2005. In 1982 he earned the title of 'Golden Arm' at Lord's for his match winning bowling spell against England.

In January 2021, Mudassar was appointed by the Emirates Cricket Board as a national selector and head of the National Academy Program. He was head coach of the United Arab Emirates national under-19 cricket team for the 2021 ACC Under-19 Asia Cup and the 2022 ICC Under-19 Cricket World Cup.

References

External links 

1956 births
Living people
Pakistan One Day International cricketers
Cricketers at the 1979 Cricket World Cup
Cricketers at the 1983 Cricket World Cup
Cricketers at the 1987 Cricket World Cup
Pakistan Test cricketers
Habib Bank Limited cricketers
Pakistan International Airlines cricketers
United Bank Limited cricketers
Cheshire cricketers
Pakistani cricketers
Minor Counties cricketers
Pakistani expatriates in England
Recipients of the Pride of Performance
Cricketers from Lahore
Lahore A cricketers
Pakistan Universities cricketers
Pakistan International Airlines A cricketers
Punjab (Pakistan) cricketers
Pakistani expatriates in Kenya
Punjabi people
Pakistani cricket coaches
M Parkinson's World XI cricketers
Scarborough Festival President's XI cricketers
People from Lahore